Burba Mohan Tripura is a Indian politician from Tripura. He is a member of Bharatiya Janata Party.He won the election in 2018 as a  Member of Legislative Assembly (MLA) representing Karbook
In 2022, he left BJP and joins Tipra Motha

References

Members of the Tripura Legislative Assembly
1955 births
Living people